Tales from the Hood: The Soundtrack is the soundtrack to Rusty Cundieff's 1995 horror film, Tales from the Hood. It was released on May 9, 1995 through MCA Records, and consists of twelve songs by various hip hop music recording artists. The album features performances by the likes of Wu-Tang Clan, Facemob, Gravediggaz, Havoc & Prodeje, MC Eiht, Scarface, Spice 1, Tha Chill, The Click  and more. Audio production was handled by several record producers, including Inspectah Deck, Mike Dean, N.O. Joe, Kurupt, Too Poetic. Spike Lee served as one of six executive producers on the album.

The soundtrack, which consisted entirely of gangsta rap and hardcore hip hop music, made it to number 16 on the Billboard 200 and number 1 on the Top R&B/Hip-Hop Albums.

Domino and Tha Chill's title track "Tales from the Hood" was the soundtrack's lone charting single becoming a hit on the Hot Rap Songs chart, where it peaked at #8. Both "Tales From the Hood" and Wu-Tang Clan's "Let Me at Them" had promotional music videos released. Havoc & Prodeje's song "The Hood Got Me Feelin' the Pain" featuring Dawn Green also had a music video released.

Track listing

Charts

Weekly charts

Year-end charts

Certifications

See also
List of number-one R&B albums of 1995 (U.S.)

References

External links

1995 soundtrack albums
Hip hop soundtracks
MCA Records soundtracks
Gangsta rap soundtracks
Albums produced by MC Eiht
Albums produced by Prodeje
Albums produced by N.O. Joe
Albums produced by Studio Ton
Albums produced by Mike Dean (record producer)
Horror film soundtracks
Comedy film soundtracks
Drama film soundtracks